CNDA may refer to:

California Naturopathic Doctors Association
Certified Network Defense Architect
Cour nationale du droit d'asile
Canadian Naval Divers Association